The Larry Sanders Show is an American sitcom set in the office and studio of a fictional late-night talk-show. The series was created by Garry Shandling and Dennis Klein and aired from August 1992 to May 1998 on the HBO cable television network. Throughout its run, numerous celebrities have made guest appearances, usually playing fictionalized versions of themselves.

Season 1
Episode 1: "The Garden Weasel"
 Robert Hays as himself 
 James Karen as Sheldon Davidoff 
 Deborah May as Melanie Parrish 
 Kathy Kinney as dog trainer
 Episode 2: "The Promise"
 David Spade as himself
 Dana Delany as herself 
 William Shatner as himself 
 Cindy Morgan as Karen Jackson 
 Episode 3: "The Spider Episode"
 Carol Burnett as herself 
 Jon Lovitz as himself 
 Steve Duchesne as himself 
 Steven R. Kutcher as himself 
 Episode 4: "Guest Host"
 Dana Carvey as himself 
 Anne-Marie Johnson as Barbara Kirsh 
 James Karen as Sheldon Davidoff 
 Hervé Villechaize as himself
 Episode 5: "The New Producer" 
 Robert Morton as himself 
 Jeff Cesario as himself 
 Ian Buchanan as Jonathan Litman 
 Evelina Fernandez as Nina  
 Episode 6: "The Flirt Episode" 
 Mimi Rogers as herself 
 Michael Richards as himself 
 Carmen Filpi as Bert Crawley
 Sam Whipple as Makeup artist 
 Mindy Sterling as Writer
 Episode 7: "Hank's Contract"
 Robin Williams as himself 
 George Foreman as himself
 James Karen as Sheldon Davidoff 
 Episode 8: "Out of the Loop"
 Peter Falk as himself 
 Kimberley Kates as Sally
 Sam Whipple as Makeup artist
 Episode 9: "The Talk Show Episode"
 Billy Crystal as himself 
 Catherine O'Hara as herself
 Episode 10: "Party"
 Martin Mull as himself
 Episode 11: "The Warmth Episode"
 Richard Simmons as himself 
 Mindy Sterling as Writer 
 John Riggi as Photographer 
 Sam Whipple as Makeup artist
 Episode 12: "A Brush With (the Elbow of) Greatness"
 David Paymer as Norman Litkey
 Tom Dahlgren as Ben Smalley
 John Riggi as Reporter
 Jeanne Basone as Cindy Remington
 Bella Shaw as herself
 Episode 13: "The Hey Now Episode"
 Bob Saget as himself 
 Earl Holliman as himself 
 T Bone Burnett as himself
 Sam Whipple as Makeup artist
 Ray Combs as himself
 Mindy Sterling as Writer
 Patrick Thomas O'Brien as Carl Henckel

Season 2
 Episode 1: "The Breakdown: Part 1""
 Deborah May as Melanie Parrish
 Kathy Ireland as herself 
 Los Lobos as themselves
 Victor Raider-Wexler as Doctor
 John Riggi as Steve
 Episode 2: The Breakdown: Part 2"
 Dana Delany as herself 
 Helen Hunt as herself 
 Teri Garr as herself
 Susan Anton as herself
 John Riggi as Steve
 Kristin Davis as Bri
 Episode 3: "The List"
 Alec Baldwin as himself
 Ed Begley Jr. as himself 
 Daniel Baldwin as himself
 Episode 4: "The Stalker"
 Phil Hartman as himself 
 Corbin Bernsen as himself
 Nelson Ascencio as Xavier The Burglar
 Episode 5: "Larry's Agent"
 Barry Levinson as himself
 Doc Severinsen as himself
 Tommy Newsom as himself 
 John Pleshette as Leo 
 James Karen as Sheldon Davidoff 
 Bob Odenkirk as Stevie Grant
 Episode 7: "Life Behind Larry"
 David Letterman as himself 
 Steven Wright as himself 
 Kevin Nealon as himself 
 Bobcat Goldthwait as himself
 Tom Snyder as himself 
 Deborah May as Melanie Parrish
 Richard Lewis as himself
 Episode 8: "Artie's Gone"
 Bruno Kirby as himself 
 Porno for Pyros as themselves
 Steven Wright as himself
 Les Lannom as Tech Guy
 Episode 9: "Larry Loses Interest"
 Suzanne Somers as herself 
 Joan Embery as herself
 Anita Barone as Michelle 
 Richard Frank as Thomas
 Les Lannom as Stagehand
 Episode 10: "Larry's Partner"
 Eric Bogosian as Stan Paxton
 Episode 11: "Broadcast Nudes"
 Hugh Hefner as himself
 Episode 12: Larry's Birthday"
 Sugar Ray Leonard as himself
 John Riggi as Mike Patterson
 Miguel Perez as Camera #1
 Julio Oscar Mechoso as Camera #2
 Episode 13: "Being There"
 Gary Kemp as Jake Woodward
 Talia Balsam as Dora
 Episode 14: "The Performance Artist"
 Roseanne Barr as herself 
 Tom Arnold as himself 
 Jay Leno as himself
 Tim Miller as himself
 George Segal as himself 
 John Riggi as Mike Patterson
 Episode 15: "Hank's Wedding"
 Ed McMahon as himself 
 Adam Sandler as himself 
 Alex Trebek as himself
 Leah Lail as Margaret Dolan
 Episode 16: "Off Camera"
 Elizabeth Ashley as herself 
 John Ritter as himself 
 Gene Siskel as himself 
 Warren Zevon as himself 
 Joshua Malina as Robert Brody
 Peter Tolan as Adam Loderman
 Episode 17: "The Grand Opening" 
 Martin Mull as himself 
 Burt Reynolds as himself 
 Jerry Seinfeld as himself 
 John Riggi as Mike Patterson
 Episode 18: "New York or L.A."
 Chris Farley as himself 
 Howard Stern as himself 
 Bob Odenkirk as Stevie Grant 
 David Warner as Richard Germain
 Robin Quivers as herself

Season 3
Episode 1: "Montana"
 Bernadette Peters as herself 
 Robin Williams as himself 
 David Warner as Richard Germain
 Episode 2: "You're Having My Baby"
 Mimi Rogers as herself
 Ray Wise as Lloyd Simon
 Tracey Ellis as Mary Beth Nagler
 Episode 3: "Would You Do Me a Favor?"
 Jason Alexander as himself 
 Warren Frost as Jerry Sanders
 French Stewart as Intern
 Episode 4: "The Gift Episode"
 Danny DeVito as himself
 Jimmie Walker as himself 
 Paul Willson as Bob Minkoff
 Episode 5: "People's Choice"
 Elvis Costello as himself 
 Rita Moreno as herself 
 Bob Odenkirk as Stevie Grant
 Deborah May as Melanie Parrish 
 Episode 6: "Hank's Night in the Sun"
 George Wendt as himself 
 Shadoe Stevens as himself
 Episode 7: "Office Romance"
 Bob Saget as himself
 Episode 8: "The Mr. Sharon Stone Show"
 Sharon Stone as herself
 David Paymer as Norman Litkey
 Julianne Phillips as herself
 Lisa Edelstein as Diane French
 Episode 9: "Headwriter"
 Dave Thomas as himself
 John Riggi as Mike Patterson
 Jim Turner as Greg
 Episode 10: "Like No Business I Know"
 Bobcat Goldthwait as himself 
 Regis Philbin as himself
 Phil Leeds as Sid Bessel
 Episode 11: "Larry Loses a Friend"
 Jon Lovitz as himself
 Mark Roberts as Leo Metcalf
 Elsa Raven as Jarina Venvenich
 Episode 12: "Doubt of the Benefit"
 Rob Reiner as himself
 Richard Belzer as himself 
 Pauly Shore as himself
 Episode 13: "Hank's Divorce"
 Leah Lail as Margaret Dolan
 Wayne Rogers as himself
 Episode 14: "The Fourteenth Floor"
 John Ritter as himself 
 Deborah May as Melanie Parrish
 Matt Letscher as Daniel Pryor 
 Haley Joel Osment as Little Boy
 Episode 15: "Next Stop...Bottom"
 Sarah Jessica Parker as herself 
 Mary Gross as herself
 Wendy Liebman as herself
 David Viscott as himself
 Phil Leeds as Sid Bessel
 Patrick Bristow as Raoul 
 Angelle Brooks as Felicia 
 Gloria LeRoy as Helen
 Episode 16: "Arthur's Crises"
 Clint Black as himself 
 Kris Kristofferson as himself
 Episode 17: "End of the Season"
 Roseanne Barr as herself
 Pat Sajak as himself 
 Jeff Cesario as himself 
 Mark Sweet as himself
 Michel Richard as himself
 Bob Odenkirk as Stevie Grant

Season 4
 Episode 1: "Roseanne's Return"
 Roseanne Barr as herself
 Chevy Chase as himself
 Charles Cioffi as Dr. Reisman
 Episode 2: "Hank's New Assistant"
 Dana Carvey as himself
 Peter Dante as Delivery Man
 Episode 3: "Arthur After Hours"
 Ryan O'Neal as himself 
 Sandra Bernhard as herself
 Elya Baskin as Nicolae 
 Episode 4: "The Bump"
 Jeff Cesario as himself
 David Duchovny as himself
 Rob Lowe as himself
 Vendela Kirsebom as herself
 Barry Nolan as Newscaster
 Episode 5: "Jeannie's Visit"
 Tatjana Patitz as herself
 Episode 6: "The P.A."
 Colin Quinn as Cully
 Chris Isaak as himself
 Larry King as himself
 Episode 7: "Hank's Sex Tape"
 Henry Winkler as himself
 Norm Macdonald as himself
 Phil Leeds as Sid Bessel 
 Jennifer Rhodes as Irene Goodman
 Athena Massey as Woman #1
 Jon Favreau as Jon
 Episode 8: "Nothing Personal"
 Jeff Goldblum as himself
 Marg Helgenberger as Susan Elliott
 Episode 9: "Brother, Can You Spare 1.2 Million?"
 Paul Willson as Frank
 Molly Hagan as Ad Executive
 Episode 10: "Conflict of Interest"
 Bob Odenkirk as Stevie Grant
 Jennifer Aniston as herself
 Beck as himself
 Deborah May as Melanie Parrish 
 Andy Kindler as himself
 Episode 11: "I Was a Teenage Lesbian"
 Brett Butler as herself
 Susan Gibney as Kia
 Michael Boatman as Greg
 Episode 12: "Larry's Sitcom"
 Chris Elliott as himself
 Jennie Garth as herself
 Kevin Nealon as himself
 Bob Odenkirk as Stevie Grant
 Christine Healy as Kim
 Peter Dante as Steve
 Harvey Vernon as Harlan Wilcox
 Episode 13: "Larry's Big Idea"
 Courteney Cox as herself
 David Letterman as himself
 Episode 14: "Beverly and the Prop Job"
 Paul Mooney as Clyde
 Victoria Principal as herself
 Dick Anthony Williams as Beverly's Father
 Episode 15: "0.409"
 Shawn Colvin as herself
 John Stamos as himself
 Sam Rubin as himself
 Gerrit Graham as Kevin
 Episode 16: "Eight"
 Fred de Cordova as himself
 Farrah Fawcett as herself
 k.d. lang as herself
 Mandy Patinkin as himself
 Pat O'Brien as himself
 Rosie O'Donnell as herself
 Ryan O'Neal as himself
 George Segal as himself
 Noah Wyle as himself
 Episode 17: "Larry's on Vacation"
 Sandra Bernhard as herself
 Julianna Margulies as herself
 Gloria Steinem as herself
 Deborah May as Melanie Parrish
 Lois Foraker as Ellen Boyd

Season 5
 Episode 1: "Everybody Loves Larry"
 Jon Stewart as himself 
 David Duchovny as himself
 Elvis Costello as himself
 Charles Nelson Reilly as himself
 Deborah May as Melanie Parrish
 Laura Cayouette as Carol 
 Peter Dante as Steve
 Episode 2: "My Name is Asher Kingsley"
 Amy Aquino as Rabbi Marcy Klein
 Tom Poston as himself 
 They Might Be Giants as themselves
 Deborah May as Melanie Parrish
 Jon Korkes as Stu
 Ned Bellamy as Carl
 Episode 3: "Where is the Love?"
 Tom Shales as himself
 Sally Field as herself
 Sting as himself
 Jake Johannsen as himself
 John Robert Hoffman as David
 Episode 4: "Ellen, Or Isn't She?"
 Ellen DeGeneres as herself
 Bob Odenkirk as Stevie Grant
 Scott Jaeck as Jake
 Episode 5: "The New Writer"
 Kevin Nealon as himself
 Sarah Silverman as Wendy Traston
 Shawn Colvin as herself
 Todd Barry as Keith
 Bil Dwyer as Ed
 Episode 6: "Matchmaker"
 Tim Conway as himself
 Harvey Fierstein as himself
 Nicollette Sheridan as herself
 Tim DeKay as Gordon
 Tim Maculan as Allen
 Episode 7: "Make a Wish"
 Ben Stiller as himself
 Jim Belushi as himself
 David Paymer as Norman Litkey
 Chauncey Leopardi as Charlie
 Brooke Smith as Tonya Bailey
 Robin Bain as Model
 Episode 8: "Artie, Angie, Hank and Hercules"
 Angie Dickinson as herself
 Don Rickles as himself
 Laura Leighton as herself
 Taylor Nichols as Robbie
 Episode 9: "The Prank"
 Lori Loughlin as herself
 John Stamos as himself
 Cecil Hoffman as Michelle Hollaway
 Butthole Surfers as themselves
 Todd Barry as Keith 
 Robert Mailhouse as Gary Rindels 
 Episode 10: "The Book"
 Dana Delany as herself
 Bruno Kirby as himself 
 Marlee Matlin as herself
 Brooke Shields as herself
 Joyce Brothers as herself
 Bob Odenkirk as Stevie Grant
 Joseph C. Phillips as James
 Episode 11: "Pain Equals Funny"
 Kirk Baily as Ed
 Suli McCullough as Jack
 Episode 12: "The Roast"
 Kip Addotta as himself
 Dana Carvey as himself
 Norm Crosby as himself
 Al Franken as himself
 Bruno Kirby as himself
 Bill Maher as himself
 Carl Reiner as himself
 Jon Stewart as himself
 Carrot Top as himself
 Bob Odenkirk as Stevie Grant
 David Paymer as Norman Litkey
 Episode 13: "Larry's New Love"
 Melinda McGraw as Alex
 Bruce Greenwood as Roger Bingham
 Jeff Foxworthy as himself
 Daisy Fuentes as herself
 Warren Littlefield as himself
 Paul Westerberg as himself

Season 6
 Episode 1: "Another List"
 Jon Stewart as himself
 Winona Ryder as herself
 Smash Mouth as themselves
 Bruce Greenwood as Roger Bingham
 Joshua Malina as Kenny Mitchell
 George Wyner as Paul Fisher
 Episode 2: "The Beginning of the End"
 Jon Stewart as himself
 Colin Hay as himself
 Bruce Greenwood as Roger Bingham 
 Joshua Malina as Kenny Mitchell
 Bob Odenkirk as Stevie Grant
 Charles Cioffi as Dr. Reisman
 Episode 3: "As My Career Lay Dying"
 Lea Thompson as herself
 Bob Costas as himself
 Jim Gray as himself
 Fred de Cordova as himself
 Pat Sajak as himself
 Andy Williams as himself
 Donny Osmond as himself
 Jeff Kahn as Jeff
 Jim Brooks as Vern the Intern
 Episode 4: "Pilots and Pens Lost"
 Dave Chappelle as himself
 Bridget Fonda as herself
 Jonathan Katz as himself
 Carlos Jacott as Bill
 Jenna Stern as Lisa
 Episode 5: "The Interview"
 Jim Belushi as himself
 Ben Folds Five as themselves
 Maureen O'Boyle as herself
 Vince Vaughn as himself
 David Spade as himself
 David Paymer as Norman Litkey
 Episode 6: "Adolf Hankler"
 Jon Stewart as himself
 Wayne Federman as Stan Sanders
 Jason Alexander as himself
 Kristen Johnston as herself
 Wu-Tang Clan as themselves
 Joshua Malina as Kenny Mitchell
 Deborah May as Melanie Parrish
 Richard Penn as Dr. Reisman
 Episode 7: "Beverly's Secret"
 Michael Bolton as himself
 Drew Carey as himself
 Eriq La Salle as himself
 Tom Amandes as Russ Schmitt 
 Ashley Gardner as Fran Schmitt
 Wade Williams as Mike
 Steven Wright as himself
 Episode 8: "I Buried Sid"
 Laura Dern as herself
 Jerry Stiller as himself
 Larry Miller as himself
 Paul Willson as Fred
 Rosey Grier as himself
 Char Margolis as herself
 Heidi Klum as herself
 Episode 9: "Just the Perfect Blendship"
 Gina Gershon as herself
 Jeff Goldblum as himself
 Illeana Douglas as herself
 Terry Bradshaw as himself
 Sarah Silverman as Wendy Traston
 Polly Draper as Dr. Monica Gordon
 Episode 10: "Putting the "Gay" Back in Litigation"
 Illeana Douglas as herself
 Bruno Kirby as himself
 Ed Begley Jr. as himself
 Drew Barrymore as herself
 Sarah Silverman as Wendy Traston
 Episode 11: "Flip"
 Jim Carrey as himself
 Jerry Seinfeld as himself
 Tim Allen as himself
 Ellen DeGeneres as herself
 Carol Burnett as herself
 Sean Penn as himself
 Clint Black as himself
 Warren Beatty as himself
 David Duchovny as himself
 Greg Kinnear as himself
 Bruno Kirby as himself
 Tom Petty as himself
 Jon Stewart as himself
 Marshall Bell as Sound Guy
 David Bowe as Jimmy Franks
 Bob Odenkirk as Stevie Grant
 David Paymer as Norman Litkey
 Paul Willson as Fred

Guest Stars
Lists of guest appearances in television